Liu Shan (207–271), courtesy name Gongsi, was the second and last emperor of the state of Shu Han during the Three Kingdoms period. As he ascended the throne at the age of 16, Liu Shan was entrusted to the care of the Chancellor Zhuge Liang and Imperial Secretariat Li Yan. His reign of 40 years was the longest of all emperors in the Three Kingdoms era. During Liu Shan's reign, many campaigns were led against the rival state of Cao Wei, primarily by Zhuge Liang and his successor Jiang Wei, but to little avail, due to their drastic mismatch in terms of population and size of reigned area. Liu Shan eventually surrendered to Wei in 263 after Deng Ai led a surprise attack on the Shu capital Chengdu. He was quickly relocated to Luoyang, capital of Wei, and enfeoffed as "Duke Anle". There he enjoyed his last years peacefully before dying, most probably of natural causes, in 271.

Widely known by his infant name "Adou / Edou", Liu Shan was commonly perceived as an incapable ruler. He was also accused of indulging in pleasures while neglecting state affairs. However, some modern scholars have taken a different opinions on Liu Shan's capability, as Liu Shan's long reign in Shu Han was free of bloody court coups and bloodshed and was the only court in the Three Kingdoms era to remain relatively bloodless. Not only that, in the Chronicles of the Three Kingdoms, Zhuge Liang was recorded to have praised Liu Shan as highly intelligent. Nevertheless, the name "Adou" is today still commonly used in Chinese to describe incapable people who would not achieve anything even with significant assistance.

As Chen Shou, the author of Records of Three Kingdoms, noted, contrary to tradition, Zhuge Liang did not establish a history bureau at Liu Shan's court, and after Zhuge's death, it appeared Liu did not revive that post. Therefore, many of the events during his reign were unrecorded, causing limited details about Liu Shan's reign in historical records.

Early life
Liu Shan was the eldest son of the warlord Liu Bei and was born to Liu Bei's concubine Lady Gan. In 208, Liu Bei's rival Cao Cao, who had by then occupied most of northern China, launched a campaign on Jing Province. During his retreat south, Liu Bei was caught up by an elite cavalry force led by Cao Cao at the Battle of Changban, and forced to leave behind Lady Gan and Liu Shan to resume his escape. Liu Bei's general Zhao Yun stayed behind to protect the family members of Liu Bei. Holding the infant Liu Shan in his arms, Zhao Yun led the mother and child to safety. (It appears likely that Lady Gan had died sometime before 209, because when Liu Bei's wife Lady Sun effectively divorced Liu Bei in 211, Liu Shan was in her custody.)

An alternative story of Liu Shan's early life was given in A Brief History of Wei by Yu Huan. It was said that Liu Shan, then already several years old, was separated from Liu Bei when the latter was attacked by Cao Cao in Xiaopei in 200. He somehow landed in Hanzhong and was sold by slave traders. Only when Liu Bei declared himself emperor in 221 was Liu Shan reunited with his father. However, this story was rejected by Pei Songzhi, who made annotations to Records of the Three Kingdoms, taking into account various other sources.

After Liu Bei declared himself emperor of Shu Han in 221, Liu Shan was formally made the crown prince. In the following year, Liu Bei left the capital Chengdu on a campaign against Sun Quan, who had sent his general Lü Meng to invade and seize Jing Province from Liu Bei in 219. Liu Bei was defeated at the Battle of Xiaoting and, having retreated to the city of Baidicheng, eventually died in 223. Before his death, Liu Bei entrusted the young Liu Shan to the care of his chancellor Zhuge Liang. Liu Bei even told Zhuge Liang to take the throne if Liu Shan proved to be incapable.

Reign

Zhuge Liang's regency
While Zhuge Liang was alive, Liu Shan treated him as a father figure, allowing Zhuge to handle all state affairs. Zhuge Liang recommended many trusted officials, including Fei Yi, Dong Yun, Guo Youzhi and Xiang Chong into key positions. Under Zhuge Liang's advice, Liu Shan entered into an alliance with the state of Eastern Wu, helping both states to survive against the much larger state of Cao Wei. During Zhuge Liang's regency, the government was largely efficient and not corrupt, allowing the relatively small state of Shu to prepare itself for military campaigns.

In 223, Liu Shan married Zhang Fei's daughter, Empress Zhang.

In the aftermath of Liu Bei's death, the southern Nanman tribes had peeled away from Shu dominion. In 225, Zhuge Liang headed south and was able to, by both military victories and persuasion, reintegrate the southern region into the empire. For the rest of Zhuge Liang's regency, the southern Nanman people would be key contributors to Shu's campaigns against Wei.

Starting in 227, Zhuge Liang launched his five Northern Expeditions against Wei, but all except one were military failures (albeit not military disasters) in that his forces ran out of food before they were able to inflict significant damage on Wei and therefore were forced to withdraw. It was during one of Zhuge Liang's campaigns that the only real political crisis during Zhuge's regency would occur. In 231, unable to supply the troops sufficiently, Zhuge Liang's co-regent Li Yan forged an edict by Liu Shan, ordering Zhuge Liang to retreat. When Zhuge Liang discovered this, he recommended that Li Yan be removed from his office and put under house arrest, and Liu Shan accepted the recommendation.

In 234, while Zhuge Liang was on his final campaign against Wei, he grew seriously ill. Hearing about Zhuge's illness, Liu Shan sent his secretary Li Fu to the front line to visit Zhuge Liang and to request Zhuge to leave instructions on important state matters. Among other things, Zhuge Liang recommended that Jiang Wan succeed him, and that Fei Yi succeed Jiang Wan. Zhuge Liang refused to answer Li Fu's next question — who should succeed Fei Yi. Zhuge Liang died soon thereafter. Liu Shan followed Zhuge's instructions and installed Jiang Wan as the new regent.

Jiang Wan's regency
Jiang Wan was a capable administrator, and he continued Zhuge Liang's domestic policies, leaving the government largely efficient. He was also known for his tolerance of dissension and his humility. Not having much military aptitude, however, he soon abandoned Zhuge Liang's aggressive foreign policy towards Wei, and indeed in 241 withdrew most of the troops from the important border city of Hanzhong to Fu County (涪縣; in present-day Mianyang, Sichuan). From that point on, Shu was generally in a defensive posture and no longer posed a threat to Wei. According to histories of the Wu court, Shu's defensive posture was interpreted by many Wu officials as a sign that Shu was abandoning the alliance and had entered into a treaty with Wei; but Wu's emperor Sun Quan correctly identified it as merely a sign of weakness, not an abandonment of the alliance.

In 237, Empress Zhang died. That year, Liu Shan took her younger sister as a consort, and in 238 created her empress. Her title remained the same as her sister, Empress Zhang.

In 243, Jiang Wan grew ill and transferred most of his authority to Fei Yi and Fei's assistant Dong Yun. In 244, when Wei's regent Cao Shuang attacked Hanzhong, it was Fei Yi who led the troops against Cao Shuang and dealt Wei a major defeat in the Battle of Xingshi. Jiang Wan, however, remained influential until his death in 245. Soon after Jiang Wan's death, Dong Yun also died — allowing the eunuch Huang Hao, a favourite of Liu Shan's, whose power Dong Yun had curbed, to start aggrandising his power. Huang Hao was viewed as corrupt and highly manipulative in domestic matters, and the governmental efficiency that was achieved during Zhuge Liang's and Jiang Wan's regencies began to deteriorate.

Fei Yi's regency
After Jiang Wan and Dong Yun's deaths, Liu Shan named Jiang Wei as Fei Yi's assistant, but both were largely involved only in military matters, as Liu Shan gradually became more self-assertive in non-military matters. It was also around this time that he became more interested in touring the countryside and increasing the use of luxury items, both of which added stress on the treasury, albeit not cripplingly so. Jiang Wei was interested in resuming Zhuge Liang's policies of attacking Wei aggressively, a strategy that Fei Yi partially agreed with — as he allowed Jiang Wei to make raids on Wei's borders, but never gave him a large number of troops, reasoning that Shu was in no position for a major military confrontation with Wei.

In 253, Fei Yi was assassinated by the general Guo Xun, a former Wei general who had been forced to surrender but who secretly maintained his loyalty to Wei. Fei Yi's death left Jiang Wei as the de facto regent, but with a power vacuum in domestic affairs, as Jiang Wei continued to be on the borders, conducting campaigns against Wei. Huang Hao's influence increased greatly as a result.

Jiang Wei's semi-regency
After Fei Yi's death, Jiang Wei assumed command of Shu's troops and began a number of campaigns against Wei—but while they were troubling to the Wei regents Sima Shi and Sima Zhao, the attacks largely inflicted no real damage against Wei, as Jiang Wei's campaigns were plagued by one problem that had plagued Zhuge Liang's -- the lack of adequate food supply—and largely had to be terminated after a short duration. These campaigns instead had a detrimental effect on Shu, whose government no longer had the efficiency that it had during Zhuge Liang's and Jiang Wan's regencies, and therefore was unable to cope with the drain of resources that Jiang Wei's campaigns were having.

In 253, Jiang Wei made a coordinated attack on Wei, along with Wu's regent Zhuge Ke, but was eventually forced to withdraw after his troops ran out of food supplies — allowing Sima Shi to concentrate against Zhuge Ke, dealing Wu forces a devastating defeat that eventually caused so much resentment that Zhuge Ke was assassinated. This was the last of the coordinated attacks by Shu and Wu on Wei in the duration of the Shu-Wu alliance.

In 255, on one of Jiang Wei's campaigns, he dealt Wei forces a major defeat in the Battle of Didao, nearly capturing the important Wei border city Didao, but in 256, as he tried to again confront the Wei forces, he was instead dealt a defeat by Deng Ai, and this was a fairly devastating loss that left Jiang Wei with a weakened standing with the people. Many officials now openly questioned Jiang Wei's strategy, but Liu Shan took no actions to stop Jiang. Further, in 259, under Jiang Wei's suggestion, Liu Shan approved a plan where the main troops were withdrawn from major border cities to try to induce a Wei attack, with troops positioned in such a way as to intend a trapping of the Wei troops — a strategy that would be used several years later, in 263, when Wei did attack, but which would prove to be a failure.

By 261, Huang Hao's power appeared paramount. Among the key domestic officials, only Dong Jue and Zhuge Liang's son Zhuge Zhan were able to maintain their posts without flattering Huang Hao. In 262, Huang Hao would in fact try to remove Jiang Wei and replace him with his friend Yan Yu. Upon hearing this, Jiang Wei advised Liu Shan to execute Huang Hao, but the emperor denied the request, saying that the eunuch was but a servant who ran errands. Fearing retaliation, Jiang Wei left Chengdu to garrison troops at Tazhong (沓中; northwest of present-day Zhugqu County, Gansu).

According to the Wu ambassador Xue Xu, who visited Shu in 261 at the order of the Wu emperor Sun Xiu, the status that Shu was in at this point was:

The emperor is incompetent and does not know his errors; his subordinates just try to get by without causing trouble for themselves. When I was visiting them, I heard no honest words, and when I visited their countryside, the people looked hungry. I have heard of a story of swallows and sparrows making nests on top of mansions and being content, believing that it was the safest place, not realising that the haystack and the support beams were on fire and that disaster was about to come. This might be what they are like.

Fall of Shu

In 262, aggravated by Jiang Wei's constant attacks, Wei's regent Sima Zhao planned to carry out a major campaign to terminate the Shu threat once and for all. Upon hearing rumours of this plan, Jiang Wei submitted a request to Liu Shan, warning him about the mustering of Wei troops under the generals Deng Ai, Zhuge Xu, and Zhong Hui near the border. However, Huang Hao persuaded Liu Shan with fortunetelling to take no action on Jiang Wei's requests for war preparations.

In 263, Sima Zhao launched his attacks, led by Deng Ai, Zhuge Xu, and Zhong Hui. Liu Shan followed Jiang Wei's previous plans and ordered the border troops to withdraw and prepare to trap Wei forces, rather than to confront them directly. The plan, however, had a fatal flaw — it assumed that Wei forces would siege the border cities, which, instead, Deng Ai and Zhong Hui ignored, and they advanced instead on Yang'an Pass (陽安關; in present-day Hanzhong, Shaanxi), capturing it. Jiang Wei was able to meet their troops and initially repel them, but Deng Ai led his army through a treacherous mountain pass and deep into Shu territory. There he launched a surprise attack on Jiangyou (江油; in present-day Mianyang, Sichuan). After defeating Zhuge Zhan there, Deng Ai had virtually no Shu troops left between his army and the Shu capital Chengdu. Faced with the prospect of defending Chengdu against Deng Ai's troops with no defences, Liu Shan took the advice of Secretary Qiao Zhou and promptly surrendered. While the surrender was criticised by many, the historian Wang Yin, in his Records of Shu, described the move as a policy that placed the welfare of the people on top.

In March 264, Zhong Hui would carry out an attempt to seize power — which Jiang Wei, who had surrendered to Zhong Hui, tried to take advantage of to revive Shu. He advised Zhong Hui to falsely accuse Deng Ai of treason and arrest him, and, with their combined troops, rebel against Sima Zhao. Zhong Hui did so, and Jiang Wei planned to next kill Zhong Hui and his followers, and then redeclare Shu's independence under emperor Liu Shan, and had in fact written to Liu Shan to inform him of those plans. However, Zhong Hui's troops rebelled against him, and both Jiang Wei and Zhong Hui were killed in battle. Liu Shan himself was not harmed in the disturbance, although his crown prince Liu Xuan was killed in the confusion.

Life after the fall of Shu
In early 264, Liu Shan with Empress Zhang and his entire family was relocated to the Wei capital Luoyang. On 11 April 264, he was enfeoffed as Duke of Anle while his sons and grandsons became marquises.

The  by Xi Zuochi records an incident which has become the most famous tale to be associated with Liu Shan: One day, the Wei regent Sima Zhao invited Liu Shan and his followers to a feast, during which Sima Zhao arranged to have entertainers perform traditional Shu music and dance. The former Shu officials present were all saddened, but Liu Shan was visibly unmoved. When asked by Sima Zhao if he missed his former state, Liu Shan replied:

I enjoy life here and do not think of Shu at all.

This phrase has become a Chinese idiom— lèbùsīshǔ, figuratively meaning "joyful and does not think of home / the past". The phrase has a negative connotation with regards to the person's character.

According to the Annals, former Shu official Xi Zheng advised Liu Shan that the appropriate response was to lament how far he had been removed from his family tombs. Liu Shan followed the advice when he was asked the same question later, however Sima Zhao quickly guessed that he had been coached in his answer, and Liu Shan admitted as much. This was noted by Sima Zhao as a sign that Liu Shan was an incompetent fool; however, some later historians believed that it showed Liu Shan's wisdom in intentionally displaying a lack of ambition so that Sima Zhao would not view him as a threat.

Liu Shan died in 271 in Luoyang, and was given the posthumous name "Duke Si of Anle" ("the deep-thinking duke of Anle"). His fief lasted several generations during Wei's successor state, the Jin Dynasty, before being extinguished in the turmoils caused by the Wu Hu. Liu Yuan, the founder of Han Zhao, one of the states in the Sixteen Kingdoms, claimed to be a legitimate successor of the Han Dynasty. He gave Liu Shan the posthumous name "Emperor Xiaohuai" ("the filial and kind emperor").

Assessment
Liu Shan is traditionally considered as an incompetent rulers who trusted evil courtiers (such as Huang Hao), was responsible for Shu Han's fall, and behaved despicably in front of Sima Zhao. He is also criticized for not awarding a posthumous Marquis title to Zhao Yun, the one who saved his life and also contributed greatly to Shu Han, in a timely fashion (he only did so after the complaint of Jiang Wei and others).

However, several opinions cast doubt on this assessment. Even competent emperors like Emperor Wu of Han had evil courtiers beside him; Liu Shan is not the only case. Moreover, surrounding Liu Shan were not only evil courtiers, but also many competent and talented officers like Jiang Wan, Fei Yi and Dong Yun. Secondly, Liu Shan surrendering without much fighting is blameworthy, but the fall of Shu Han was actually due to many reasons. Thirdly, for the case of Zhao Yun, Zhao's official position during his life was actually lower than Guan Yu, Zhang Fei, Ma Chao and Huang Zhong. Hence, Liu Shan's awarding of posthumous Marquis titles to the latter four but not timely to Zhao Yun was understandable. Finally, Liu Shan's behavior in front of Sima Zhao was purposeful: he pretended to be stupid and despicable so that Sima Zhao would ignore him and spare his family, and Liu Shan was successful. Being able to fool the distrustful Sima Zhao meant Liu Shan was actually not a fool.

Moreover, there were notable signs of Liu Shan's competence during his reign. He cleverly retook direct control of state affairs after the death of Zhuge Liang and appointed Jiang Wan and Fei Yi so that the two could keep each other in check. In 238, Cao Wei made war with Gongsun Yuan and many people in Shu Han believed it was a good chance for northern expansion. However, Liu Shan carefully instructed Fei Yi to attack only in combination with Eastern Wu, and only when Cao Wei was unprepared. Several historical commentators thus compare Liu Shan's caution favorably with that of Liu Bei and Zhuge Liang's costly and ineffective campaigns. Finally, Liu Shan's surrender in 262-263 has been viewed with sympathy as an inevitable choice by commentators in both historical records and contemporary times, due to the vast difference in population and military capability between the two states, as well as the tendency of victors to massacre the citizens of enemy states that had refused to surrender. In particular, Liu Shan's surrender is often compared favorably with that of Gongsun Yuan, a regional warlord who attempted to retake power by allying with Eastern Wu, which eventually resulted in the extermination of his clan, and a bloody massacre of his population base at Liaodong. In contrast, Liu Shan's surrender led to a peaceful transfer of power to the Wei kingdom, with most of the population unharmed, except during the week of unrest caused by Jiang Wei's plotting.

Family

Empress Jing'ai, of the Zhang clan (敬哀皇后 張氏; d.237)
Empress Zhang, of the Zhang clan (張皇后 張氏; 237-264)
Noble Lady Wang, of the Wang clan (王貴人 王氏)
Crown Prince Liu Xuan (刘璿), first son
Zhaoyi Li, of the Li clan (李昭儀 李氏)
Unknown:
Liu Yao, Prince of Anding (安定王劉瑤; d.311),  second son
Liu Cong, Prince of Xihe (西河王劉琮; d.262), third son
Liu Zan (劉瓚; d.311), fourth son
Liu Chen, Prince of Beidi  (北地王劉諶), fifth son
Liu Xun, Prince of Xinxing (新興王劉恂; d.311), sixth son; later succeeded the peerage of Duke of Anle
Liu Qian (劉虔; d.311), seventh son

In popular culture

Romance of the Three Kingdoms
Liu Shan appears as a character in the historical novel Romance of the Three Kingdoms by Luo Guanzhong, which romanticises the historical events before and during the Three Kingdoms period. In the novel, Liu Shan is generally portrayed as an incapable ruler who was easily swayed by words, especially those from the eunuch Huang Hao, whom he favoured.

In modern works

Liu Shan is a playable character in Koei's Dynasty Warriors video game series, first available in the seventh instalment, as well as in Warriors Orochi 3, also by Koei.

See also
 List of Chinese monarchs
 Lists of people of the Three Kingdoms

References

Notes

Citations

Sources 
 Chen Shou (280s or 290s). Records of the Three Kingdoms. Pei Songzhi, annotation, 429. Hong Kong: Zhonghua Publishing, 1971. 5 vols.
 
 Luo Guanzhong (14th century). Romance of the Three Kingdoms (Sanguo Yanyi).

External links
Translation of the biography of Liu Shan in the Chronicles of the Three Kingdoms at Empire Divided

207 births
271 deaths
3rd-century Chinese monarchs
Shu Han emperors
Family of Liu Bei
People from Xiangyang
Monarchs taken prisoner in wartime
Heads of government who were later imprisoned